Pseudophilothrips is a genus of thrips in the family Phlaeothripidae.

Species
 Pseudophilothrips adisi
 Pseudophilothrips amabilis
 Pseudophilothrips avocadis
 Pseudophilothrips didymopanicis
 Pseudophilothrips fugitivus
 Pseudophilothrips gandolfoi
 Pseudophilothrips ichini
 Pseudophilothrips moundi
 Pseudophilothrips obscuricornis
 Pseudophilothrips perseae
 Pseudophilothrips retanai
 Pseudophilothrips seticollis
 Pseudophilothrips varicornis

References

Phlaeothripidae
Thrips
Thrips genera